Oliver Taylor may refer to:
 Oliver Taylor (actor) (born 1994), British actor
 Oliver Taylor (boxer) (born 1938), Australian boxer
 Ollie Taylor (born 1947), former National Basketball Association player
 Oliver Taylor (footballer, born 1869) (1869–1945), Wales international footballer
 Oliver Taylor (footballer, born 1880), English footballer